Semuel Jusof Warouw (1900 – 22 October 1983) was an Indonesian physician who served as Prime Minister of the State of East Indonesia briefly in 1947, in addition to being Minister of Health within NIT between 1947 and 1949.

Early life and career
Born in 1900, he was of Minahasan descent. Warouw was educated at the Batavia Medical College (STOVIA), during which he chaired an association of Minahasan students. He was an ophthalmologist by training, and also worked as a civil servant. In the 1930s, he had been elected to the city council of Manado. He advocated for a federal Indonesian state with strong Dutch ties, publishing a manifesto in 1946.

When the State of East Indonesia (NIT) was established in December 1946, Warouw was working at the health bureau of Manado as a physician, and he was appointed Minister of Health in the cabinets of Nadjamuddin Daeng Malewa. During Nadjamuddin's trip to New York City in mid-1947, he was appointed acting prime minister. The Nadjamuddin cabinet collapsed due to a corruption scandal in late September, and Warouw was appointed as the next formateur on 8 October 1947. While he managed to form a cabinet by 11 October (where he continued to hold the office of Minister of Health), Warouw was politically unaffiliated and had little political experience.

Warouw had openly supported the continuation of Dutch sovereignty over Indonesia, in direct opposition to a significant faction within the NIT's legislature, and he supported Dutch military actions against the Indonesian Republicans. This was exarcebated by him being a Christian, which made Islamist groups and representatives from South Sulawesi distrust him. In governing, he also tended to bypass parliamentary ratification, which did not sit well with legislators. By 9 December, a motion of faith in the government had been defeated, resulting in Warouw resigning as Prime Minister. Warouw would remain Minister of Health in the succeeding cabinet of Ide Anak Agung Gde Agung, until his replacement on 12 January 1949. During Dutch-Indonesian negotiations in 1949, he promoted Minahasan independence to gain political leverage, but this did not amount to much, and he returned to medicine after the transfer of sovereignty.

Starting in 1956, he joined Hasanuddin University's faculty of medicine, his focus being on eye diseases and neurology. He later also headed Sulawesi's ophthalmological hospital.

He died on 22 October 1983.

References

1900 births
1983 deaths
Indonesian ophthalmologists
Minahasa people
Indonesian Christians
Politicians from the State of East Indonesia
STOVIA alumni